is a rural district in Gunma Prefecture, Japan. As of January 2015, the district had an estimated population of 22,972 and an area of 365.82 km2, with a population density of 62.8 people per square kilometer.

Towns and villages
Kanra
Shimonita
Nanmoku
Parts of the city of Takasaki and all of the city of Tomioka were formerly part of the district.

History
Its etymology indicates that it was an area settled by large numbers of people from the Korean peninsula. Per a census conducted at the end of the Edo period,  the area was divided into three towns and 79 villages administered as tenryō directly by the Tokugawa shogunate, 21 villages under the control of Nanokaichi Domain and 32 villages under the control of Obata Domain. Two more villages were under the shared control of Obata Domain and the Tokugawa shogunate.

On December 7, 1878, the area was divided into Minamikanra District (which became Tano District and Kitakanra District (present-day Kanra District).
With the establishment of the municipality system on April 1, 1889 the area was organized into five towns (Tomioka, Ichinomiya,  Myōgi, Shimonita and Fukushima) and 18 villages.

Modern timeline
1925, May 10 – Obata village was raised to town status
1950, April 1 – Kitakanra District was renamed Kanra District
1954, April 1 – Ono, Kuroiwa, and Takase villages and Ichinomiya town were merged into Tomioka, which was then raised to city status.
1955, January 15 – Iwadaira village is annexed by Yoshii Town in Tano District
1955, March 10 - Shimonita annexed the villages of Kosaka, Nishimaki, Aokura and Mayama
1955, March 15 – Akihata village was annexed by Obata Town
1955, March 20 – Taka village was annexed by Myōgi Town
1955, April 1 – Yoshida village was annexed by Tomioka City
1959, February 1 – Fukushima and Niiya villages were into Obata Town, which was renamed Kanra Town
1960, April 1 – Nyu village was merged into Tomioka City
2006, March 27 - Myōgi town merged into the city of Tomioka

Districts in Gunma Prefecture